The 2018 Pac-12 Conference football season represented the 40th season of Pac-12 football that took place during the 2018 NCAA Division I FBS football season. The season began on August 30, 2018 and ended with 2018 Pac-12 Championship Game on November 30 at Levi Stadium in Santa Clara, California. The Pac-12 is a Power Five conference under the College Football Playoff format along with the Atlantic Coast Conference, the Big 12 Conference, the Big Ten Conference, and the Southeastern Conference. The 2018 season was the Pac-12's eighth for the twelve teams divided into two divisions of six each, named North and South.

Previous season
USC defeated Stanford again 31–28 in a rematch from Week Two in the 2017 season for the Pac-12 Football Championship Game.

Nine teams participated in bowl games. Utah defeated West Virginia 30–14 in the Heart of Dallas Bowl. Oregon lost to Boise State 28–38 in the Las Vegas Bowl Arizona lost to Purdue 35–38 at the Foster Farms Bowl. Arizona State lost to NC State 31–52 in the Sun Bowl. UCLA lost to Kansas State 17–35 in the Cactus Bowl. Washington State lost to Michigan State 17–41 in the Holiday Bowl. Stanford lost to TCU 37–39 in the Alamo Bowl. USC lost to Ohio State 7–24 in the Cotton Bowl Classic and Washington lost to Penn State by a score of 28–35 in the Fiesta Bowl.

Preseason
2018 Pac-12 Spring Football and number of signees on signing day:

North Division
California – 21
Oregon – 22
Oregon State – 20
Stanford – 15
Washington – 21
Washington State – 26

South Division  
Arizona – 21
Arizona State – 21
Colorado – 21
UCLA – 28
USC – 18
Utah – 20

Recruiting classes

Pac-12 Media Days
The Pac-12 conducted its annual media days at the Loews Hollywood Hotel, – The Loews Hollywood Hotel in Hollywood, CA on July 25. The event commenced with a speech by Pac-12 commissioner Larry Scott, and all 12 teams sent their head coaches and two selected players to speak with members of the media. The event along with all speakers and interviews were broadcast live on the Pac-12 Network. The teams and representatives in respective order were as follows:

 Pac-12 Commissioner – Larry Scott 
 California – Justin Wilcox (HC), Patrick Laird (RB) & Jordan Kunaszyk (LB)  
 Stanford – David Shaw (HC), J. J. Arcega-Whiteside (WR) & Alijah Holder (CB)
 Washington State – Mike Leach (HC), Kyle Sweet (WR/P) & Jalen Thompson (S)
 Washington – Chris Petersen (HC), Jake Browning (QB) & Jojo McIntosh (DB) 
 Oregon State – Jonathan Smith (HC), Blake Brandel (OL) & Kee Whetzel (LB)
 Oregon – Mario Cristobal (HC), Justin Herbert (QB) & Jalen Jelks (DL)
 Pac-12 Commissioner – Larry Scott (Q&A)
 UCLA – Chip Kelly (HC), Theo Howard (WR) & Josh Woods (LB)
 Colorado – Mike MacIntyre (HC), Rick Gamboa (LB) & Steven Montez (QB) 
 Arizona State – Herm Edwards (HC), N'Keal Harry (WR) & Manny Wilkins (QB)
 Arizona – Kevin Sumlin (HC), Khalil Tate (QB) & Colin Schooler (LB)
 Utah – Kyle Whittingham (HC), Chase Hansen (LB) & Lo Falemaka (OL)
 USC – Clay Helton (HC), Cameron Smith (LB) & Porter Gustin (LB)
 Pac-12 VP of Officiating – David Coleman (Q&A on 2018 football playing rule changes)

Preseason media polls
The Pac-12 Media Days concluded with its annual preseason media polls on July 25, 2018. Since 1992, the credentialed media has gotten the preseason champion correct just five times. Only eight times has the preseason pick even made it to the Pac-12 title game. Below are the results of the media poll with total points received next to each school and first-place votes in parentheses.

Pac-12 Champion Voting
 Washington (37)
 USC (2)
 Oregon (1)
 Stanford (1)
 UCLA (1)

 
North Division
 1. Washington (40) – 249
 2. Stanford (1) – 198
 3. Oregon (1) – 178
 4. California – 108
 5. Washington State – 98
 6. Oregon State – 45

South Division
 1. USC (22) – 225
 2. Utah (14) – 209
 3. Arizona (3) – 178
 4. UCLA (2) – 116
 5. Colorado (1) – 80
 6. Arizona State – 72

First place votes in 

References:

Head coaches

Coaching changes
There were five coaching changes following the 2018 season including Kevin Sumlin with Arizona, Herm Edwards with Arizona State, Mario Cristobal with Oregon, Johnathan Smith with Oregon State & Chip Kelly with UCLA.

Coaches

Rankings

Schedules

All times Pacific time.  Pac-12 teams in bold.

Rankings reflect those of the AP poll for that week.

Regular season

Week 1

Week 2

Week 3

Week 4

Week 5

Week 6

Week 7

Week 8

Week 9

Week 10

Week 11

Week 12

Week 13

Week 14
The Stanford–California football game was moved from November 17 to December 1 due to poor air quality from wildfires in the Bay Area.

Pac-12 Championship Game

The championship game will played on Friday November 30, 2018. It will feature the teams with the best conference records from each division, the North (Washington) and the South (Utah). This will be the eighth championship game.

Pac-12 vs other conferences

Pac-12 vs Power Five matchups
This is a list of the power conference teams (ACC, Big 10, Big 12, Notre Dame and SEC) that the Pac-12 plays in the non-conference games. Although the NCAA does not consider BYU a "Power Five" school, the Pac-12 considers games against BYU as satisfying its "Power Five" scheduling requirement. All rankings are from the AP Poll at the time of the game.

Records against other conferences
2018 records against non-conference foes as of November 26, 2018:

Regular Season

Post Season

Postseason

Bowl games

Rankings are from AP Poll.  All times Pacific Time Zone.

Selection of teams:
Bowl-eligible: Arizona State, California, Oregon, Stanford, Utah, Washington, Washington State
Bowl-ineligible: Arizona, Colorado, Oregon State, UCLA, USC

Awards and honors

Player of the week honors

Following each week's games, Pac-12 conference officials select the players of the week from the conference's teams.

All-conference teams
The following players earned All-Pac-12 honors. Any teams showing (_) following their name are indicating the number of All-Pac-12 Conference Honors awarded to that university for 1st team and 2nd team respectively. Utah leads the Pac-12 with 9 First team and 4 Second team, followed by Washington with 5 First team and 3 Second team, Stanford at 2 First team and 6 Second team, Oregon at 2 First team and 3 Second team, Washington Stateand Arizona State both with 2 First team and 2 Second team, UCLA with 1 First team and 1 Second team, Arizona, Colorado and California all with 1 First team, USC with 5 Second team, and Oregon State receiving none for either team.

First-team

Second-team

Honorable mentions
ARIZONA: DL P. J. Johnson, RJr.; WR Shawn Poindexter, Sr.; Thomas Reid III, WR, RSo.; LB Colin Schooler, So.
ARIZONA STATE:  OL Quinn Bailey, RSr.; DB Aashari Crosswell, Fr.; OL Casey Tucker, Grad.; DL Renell Wren, RSr.
CALIFORNIA: DE Luc Bequette, RJr.; DB Camryn Bynum, RSo.; P Steven Coutts, RJr.; RS Ashtyn Davis, RJr.
COLORADO: LB Rick Gamboa, Sr.; DL Mustafa Johnson, So.; LB Nate Landman, So.; RB Travon McMillian, Sr.; OL Will Sherman, Fr.; DB Evan Worthington, Sr.
OREGON: DB Ugo Amadi, Sr.; OL Jake Hanson, Jr.; OLB Justin Hollins, Sr.; DL Jordon Scott, So.; OL Penei Sewell, Fr.; OL Calvin Throckmorton, Jr.
OREGON STATE: AP/ST Andre Bodden, RJr.; WR Trevon Bradford, Jr.; WR Isaiah Hodgins, So.; RB Jermar Jefferson, Fr.
STANFORD: DB Alijah Holder, RSr.; RB Bryce Love, Sr.; LB Bobby Okereke, Sr.; TE Colby Parkinson, So.; DL Jovon Swann, Jr.
UCLA: P Stefan Flintoft, RSr.; DB Darnay Holmes, So.; WR Theo Howard, Jr.; RB Joshua Kelley, RJr.; PK JJ Molson, Jr.
USC: DB Ajene Harris, Sr.; OL Toa Lobendahn, RSr.; WR Michael Pittman Jr., Jr.; DB Marvell Tell, Sr.; RS Tyler Vaughns, RSo.
UTAH: DB Corrion Ballard, Sr.; LB Cody Barton, Sr.; OL Lo Falemaka, Sr.; DB Javelin Guidry, So.
WASHINGTON: QB Jake Browning, Sr.; DL Jaylen Johnson, Sr.; DB Jojo McIntosh, Sr.; TE Drew Sample, RSr.
WASHINGTON STATE: P Oscar Draguicevich, RSo.; RS Travell Harris, RFr.; OL Frederick Mauigoa, Jr.; LB Peyton Pelluer, Grad.; DB Jalen Thompson, Jr.; RB James Williams, RJr.; AP/ST Kainoa Wilson, RJr.; LB Jahad Woods, RSo

Pac-12 individual awards
The following individuals won the Pac-12 conference's annual player and coach awards:

Pac-12 Offensive Player of the Year

QB Gardner Minshew, Washington State

Pac-12 Defensive Player of the Year

LB Ben Burr-Kirven, Washington

Pac-12 Coach of the Year

Mike Leach, Washington State

Pac-12 Offensive Freshman Player of the Year

RB Jermar Jefferson, Oregon State

Pac-12 Defensive Freshman Player of the Year

LB Merlin Robertson, Arizona State

Pac-12 Scholar Athlete Player of the Year

LB Ben Burr-Kirven, Washington

All-Americans
The following Pac-12 players were named to the 2018 College Football All-America Team by the Walter Camp Football Foundation (WCFF), Associated Press (AP), Football Writers Association of America (FWAA), Sporting News (SN), and American Football Coaches Association (AFCA):

Academic All-America Team Member of the Year (CoSIDA):

All-Academic

First team

Second team

Honorable mentions: ARIZ: Cody Creason, Jake Glatting, Jamie Nunley; ASU: Eno Benjamin, Cody French, Jordan Hoyt, Malik Lawal, Josh Pokraka, John Riley, Brandon Ruiz, Michael Sleep-Dalton; CAL: Siulagisipai Fuimaono, Chase Garbers, Ryan Gibson, Chris Landgrebe, Malik McMorris, Chinedu Udeogu, Ricky Walker III; COLO: Lucas Cooper, Josh Goldin, Aaron Haigler, Tim Lynott, Nico Magri, Davis Price, Colby Pursell, Carson Wells; ORE: Brady Aiello, Kaulana Apelu, Jake Breeland, Brady Breeze, Braxton Burmeister, Jacob Capra, Drayton Carlberg, Jake Hanson, Hunter Kampmoyer, Shane Lemieux, Blake Maimone, Sampson Niu; OSU: B. J. Baylor, Conor Blount, Andre Bodden, Blake Brandel, Jordan Choukair, Isaiah Dunn, Keegan Firth, Champ Flemings, Andrzej Hughes-Murray, Isaiah Hodgins, Sumner Houston, Drew Kell, Connor Kelsey, Luke Leonnig, Jeffrey Manning Jr., Trent Moore, Mason Moran, Artavis Pierce, Daniel Rodriguez, Kolby Taylor, Moku Watson; STAN: Joey Alfieri, Malik Antoine, Jake Bailey, Treyjohn Butler, K. J. Costello, Obi Eboh, Tucker Fisk, Jordan Fox, Scooter Harrington, Henry Hattis, Nate Herbig, Stuart Head, Houston Heimuli, Alijah Holder, Trenton Irwin, Thunder Keck, Walker Little, Bryce Love, Alameen Murphy, Colby Parkinson, Andrew Pryts, Gabe Reid, Cameron Scarlett, Kaden Smith, Trevor Speights, Jovan Swann, Dayln Wade-Perry, Reagan Williams; UCLA: Michael Alves, Johnny Den Bleyker, Ethan Fernea, Stefan Flintoft, Dymond Lee, Christian Pabico, Adarius Pickett, Shea Pitts, Jay Shaw, Jayce Smalley, Caleb Wilson; USC: Jordan Austin, Reid Budrovich, Erik Krommenhoek, Wyatt Schmidt; UTAH: Jordan Agasiva, Marquise Blair, Nick Ford, Javelin Guidry, Tyler Huntley, Jake Jackson, Josh Nurse, Darrin Paulo, John Penisini, Hauati Pututau, Jason Shelley, Demari Simpkins, Mika Tafua, Mason Woodward; WASH: Andre Baccellia, Jake Browning, A.J. Carty, Nick Harris, Peyton Henry, Jared Hilbers, Ty Jones, Jordan Miller, Cade Otton, Race Porter, Henry Roberts, Joe Tryon-Shoyinka, Jusstis Warren, Joel Whitford; WSU: Brandon Arconado, Tristan Brock, Jack Crane, Cole Dubots, Travell Harris, Liam Ryan, Trey Tinsley.

National award winners

Home game attendance

Bold – Exceed capacity
†Season High

References